Pachytomella is a genus of mostly European capsid bugs in the tribe Halticini, erected by Odo Reuter in 1891.  The species Pachytomella parallela is recorded from northern Europe including the British Isles.

Species 
According to BioLib the following are included:
 Pachytomella alutacea (Puton, 1874)
 Pachytomella cursitans Reuter, 1905
 Pachytomella doriae (Reuter, 1884)
 Pachytomella parallela (Meyer-Dür, 1843)
 Pachytomella passerinii (A. Costa, 1841)- type species by subsequent designation: "Pachytoma minor = Phytocoris passerinii A. Costa, 1842"
 Pachytomella phoenicea (Horváth, 1884)

References

External links
 

Miridae genera
Hemiptera of Europe
Orthotylinae